Praful Waghela (born 19 November 1984) is an Indian cricketer. He made his first-class debut for Mumbai in the 2009–10 Ranji Trophy on 8 December 2009.

References

External links
 

1984 births
Living people
Indian cricketers
Mumbai cricketers
Cricketers from Mumbai